Thomas Lister, 2nd Baron Ribblesdale (23 January 1790 – 10 December 1832) was an English Peer of the Realm.

Lister was the son of Thomas Lister, 1st Baron Ribblesdale, and Rebecca Feilding. He attended Westminster School from 1800 to 1804 and matriculated at Christ Church, Oxford on 2 November 1807. 

In February 1826 he married his second cousin, Adelaide, the daughter of Thomas Lister (1772–1828) of Armitage Park, Staffordshire. They had four children: Thomas, born 1828; Adelaide, born 1827; Isabel, born 1830; and Elizabeth, born 1833 (after Lister had died). He succeeded to the barony on 22 September 1826 following the death of his father. He resided at the family estate of Gisburne Park.

In the House of Lords Lister was a supporter of Conservative principles. In October 1831 he voted against the Reform Bill. The result of the vote led to riots across England. Lister had to summon troops from Burnley barracks and arm his own tenants to protect his Gisburne Park estate. In April 1832 he was one of ten peers who had previously voted against the bill but abstained in the subsequent vote. He died later that year at Leamington following a ruptured artery.

His four-year-old son Thomas succeeded to the barony, becoming the youngest Peer of the Realm. His widow, Adelaide, married John Russell, 1st Earl Russell in 1835; she died in 1838.

References

1790 births
1832 deaths
People educated at Westminster School, London
Alumni of Christ Church, Oxford
Barons Ribblesdale